Onogur Islands (‘Onogurski ostrovi’ \o-no-'gur-ski 'os-tro-vi\) is the group of nine islands and some islets and rocks adjacent to the northwest coast of Robert Island in the South Shetland Islands, Antarctica. The area was visited by early 19th century sealers based in Clothier Harbour.

The island group is named after the settlement of Onogur in northeastern Bulgaria in connection with the Onogurs (5th-7th century).

Islands in the Onogur group

The group comprises the following islands:

 Churicheni Island
 Grod Island
 Kovach Island
 Leeve Island
 Oescus Island
 Osenovlag Island
 Redina Island
 Svetulka Island
 Vilare Island

Location
British mapping in 1822 and 1968, Chilean in 1971, Argentine in 1980, and Bulgarian in 2009.

Maps
 Livingston Island to King George Island.  Scale 1:200000.  Admiralty Nautical Chart 1776.  Taunton: UK Hydrographic Office, 1968.
 L.L. Ivanov. Antarctica: Livingston Island and Greenwich, Robert, Snow and Smith Islands. Scale 1:120000 topographic map. Troyan: Manfred Wörner Foundation, 2010.  (First edition 2009. )
 Antarctic Digital Database (ADD). Scale 1:250000 topographic map of Antarctica. Scientific Committee on Antarctic Research (SCAR). Since 1993, regularly upgraded and updated.
 L.L. Ivanov. Antarctica: Livingston Island and Smith Island. Scale 1:100000 topographic map. Manfred Wörner Foundation, 2017.

See also 
 Composite Antarctic Gazetteer
 List of Antarctic islands south of 60° S
 SCAR
 Territorial claims in Antarctica

Notes

References
 Onogur Islands. SCAR Composite Antarctic Gazetteer
 Bulgarian Antarctic Gazetteer. Antarctic Place-names Commission. (details in Bulgarian, basic data in English)

External links
 Onogur Islands. Copernix satellite image

Islands of the South Shetland Islands
Bulgaria and the Antarctic